Yandım Tokat Yandım is a  Turkish folkloric tune Çiftetelli or Kaşık Havası.

Original form
The original form of the Kasik Havasi was popular in Tokat.

See also 
 Mary Vartanian

References 

Turkish songs
Songwriter unknown
Year of song unknown